Simon Phelan (born 26 February 1986) is an Irish academic and former athlete, who is currently a lecturer at Oxford Brookes University. As an athlete, Phelan competed for Jersey as a high jumper, and won the high jump event at the 2011 Island Games.

Sports career
Phelan was born in Galway, Republic of Ireland, but moved to Jersey as a child. In 2005, he won the high jump event at the South of England Championships with a height of 2.10m. Phelan represented Jersey at the 2006 Commonwealth Games in Melbourne; he finished 18th in the qualifying round of the event, with a height of 2.05. Phelan and Lauren Therin were the only Jersey athletics competitors at the Games. Phelan won the high jump event at the 2011 Island Games with a height of 2.10m, 15 cm higher than any other competitor. Whilst studying at the University of Bath, Phelan competed for TeamBath. In 2015, Phelan jumped 2.16m at an event in Bedford; in doing so, he broke his personal best by 1 cm, and also broke the Jersey national record. Phelan competed at the 2014 Commonwealth Games in Glasgow; he finished last in his qualifying pool, with a jump of 2.06m. After the event, he said that it was "probably the worst I've jumped for a year". Phelan also came fourth at the 2015 Island Games in Jersey, which was won by fellow Jersey athlete Jason Fox. Phelan retired due to an injury.

Academic career
Phelan has a degree in coaching and sports development from the University of Bath, and as of 2014, he was studying for a PhD at the University of Birmingham. After retiring from high jump, Phelan decided that he didn't want to be a coach, and instead focused on research. He worked at the University of Northampton and the University of Birmingham, and since 2017, Phelan has been a lecturer at Oxford Brookes University.

References

External links
 European Athletics profile
 

1986 births
Living people
Alumni of the University of Bath
Alumni of the University of Birmingham
Irish high jumpers
Irish male athletes
Jersey athletes
Athletes (track and field) at the 2014 Commonwealth Games
Commonwealth Games competitors for Jersey
Sportspeople from Galway (city)
Irish emigrants to Jersey
Academics of Oxford Brookes University
Academics of the University of Birmingham
Academics of the University of Northampton